Chris Bush (born 3 July 1986) is a British playwright and artistic director.

Overview
Bush was born in Sheffield, England.   She studied at the University of York and currently resides in London.

She is best known for her 2007 work TONY! The Blair Musical, which enjoyed sell-out runs and critical acclaim at the York Theatre Royal and Edinburgh Fringe before transferring to the Pleasance Islington as winner of the inaugural Sunday Times NSDF Award for a successful off West-End run. Its sequel, Tony of Arabia, debuted at the Pleasance Dome, Edinburgh in 2008, running in rep with the original show.

In 2012 Bush made her full-length debut as a writer/performer with The Loves I Haven't Known, a musical comedy performed with regular composing partner Ian McCluskey.

In 2012-13 Bush completed a writer's attachment at the National Theatre Studio, and was the 2013 Pearson Playwright-in-Residence for Sheffield Theatres, where she wrote The Sheffield Mysteries, a contemporary take on the medieval Mystery Plays, directed by Daniel Evans.

Bush has been an Artist in Residence for the Oxford Playhouse and Sheffield Theatres, and a member of the Orange Tree Theatre Writers' Collective. She has won both the Perfect Pitch Award and Kevin Spacey Foundation Artist of Choice Award for Musical Theatre.

She has stated on numerous occasions that her favourite colour is Periwinkle. More recently, she was among the writers to receive first-look deals with ViacomCBS International Studios to start a program to amplify diverse voices.

Selected stage works 

 TONY! The Blair Musical (2007) York Theatre Royal, Pleasance
 Tony of Arabia (2008) Theatre Royal, Wakefield, Oxford North Wall, Pleasance
 WOLF (2009) The Theatre, Chipping Norton and Latitude Festival
 The Loves I Haven't Known (2012) C Venues, Edinburgh
 20 Tiny Plays about Sheffield (2013) Crucible Theatre Studio
 The Sheffield Mysteries (2014) Crucible Theatre
 Poking the Bear (2014) Theatre503
 Be|Spoke (2014) Sheffield Hallam University/Welcome to Yorkshire, Tour de Yorkshire
 Larksong (2015) New Vic Theatre
 A Declaration From the People (2015) Royal National Theatre
 A Dream (2016) Crucible Theatre
 What We Wished For (2017) Crucible Theatre
 Steel (2018) Sheffield Theatres
 The Assassination of Katie Hopkins (2018) Theatr Clwyd
 Pericles (2018) National Theatre
 The Changing Room (2018) National Theatre Connections
 The Last Noël (2018) The Old Fire Station
 Standing At The Sky's Edge (2019) Sheffield Theatres
 Faustus: That Damned Woman (2019) Lyric Hammersmith
 Kein Weltuntergang (2021) Schaubühne, Berlin
 Rock/ Paper/ Scissors (2022) Sheffield Theatres

Political views 
Despite lampooning him on stage, Bush described Tony Blair as "a decent man who made some bad decisions", and stated that she had "come to ridicule beautiful Blair not vilify him". Some have argued that Bush is not critical enough of New Labour. Writing in The Daily Telegraph, Dominic Cavendish claimed that "the country is angrier than [Tony, The Blair Musical] allows". Contrarily, Paul Lowman of The Press (York) has praised Bush's even-handedness, stating that her greatest strength is her ability to "camouflage complex issues in a vastly entertaining, glossy, media friendly package".

Bush has stated that she is proud of her British heritage, and is a supporter of immigration to the country.  On a 2009 episode of Come Dine with Me she stated that "what makes [her] really proud of Britain [is] the number of people who want to be here".

Bush champions the Koala and is a frequent donor to the Australian Koala Foundation.

Trivia
In November 2009, Bush appeared on an episode of the Channel 4 reality television programme Come Dine with Me. Bush placed joint first and received £500 of the £1000 prize, which according to her equated to a "year's wages in the theatre".

References

External links 
 Agency website
 Guide to Chris Bush's plays

1986 births
Living people
Writers from Sheffield
Alumni of the University of York
21st-century British dramatists and playwrights